Hippotion socotrensis is a moth of the family Sphingidae. It is known from dry areas from eastern Kenya to southern Ethiopia and probably Somalia. It is also present on Socotra.

Subspecies
Hippotion socotrensis socotrensis (Socotra)
Hippotion socotrensis diyllus Fawcett, 1915 (dry areas from eastern Kenya to southern Ethiopia and probably Somalia)

References

 Pinhey, E. (1962): Hawk Moths of Central and Southern Africa. Longmans Southern Africa, Cape Town.

Hippotion
Moths described in 1899
Moths of Africa
Moths of the Middle East